Yevhen Yuriyovych Shyryayev (born 22 February 1984) is a professional Ukrainian football goalkeeper who last played for FC Kaisar in the Kazakhstan Premier League. He was born in Uspenivka, Bilhorod-Dnistrovskyi Raion, in the Odessa Oblast of the Ukrainian SSR of the Soviet Union (now in Ukraine).

Yevhen Shyryayev joined FC Chornomorets Odesa in the winter of 2000–2001.

External links
 
 
 
 Profile at FC Chornomorets Odesa

1984 births
Living people
Ukrainian footballers
Ukraine under-21 international footballers
FC Chornomorets Odesa players
FC Desna Chernihiv players
FC Zirka Kropyvnytskyi players
Ukrainian Premier League players
Association football goalkeepers
FC Kaisar players
FC Real Pharma Odesa players
FC Zhemchuzhyna Odesa players
Expatriate footballers in Kazakhstan
Ukrainian expatriate sportspeople in Kazakhstan
Ukrainian expatriate footballers
Sportspeople from Odesa Oblast